The Bulgarian Euro-Left (BEL) is a pro-Western social-democratic political party in Bulgaria. The party was established on 22 February 1997 in Sofia. The party was formed by former members of the Bulgarian Socialist Party.

The party contested the April 1997 parliamentary election as the Civil Union for the Republic – Bulgarian Euro-Left, winning 5.5% of the vote and 14 seats in the National Assembly. Two deputies from the Bulgarian Business Bloc joined the BEL in February 1998.

The BEL was admitted into the Socialist International as an observer affiliate in 1999. The party was in favour of Bulgaria's accession to the European Union.

Leadership
Chairman: Aleksandar Tomov

Election results

National Assembly

European Parliament

References

1997 establishments in Bulgaria
Political parties established in 1997
Pro-European political parties in Bulgaria
Social democratic parties in Bulgaria